The 2019–20 Slovak Extraliga season was the 27th season of the Slovak Extraliga, the highest ice hockey league in Slovakia.
Since the 2018–19 season, the league also includes two teams from Hungary.

The season was ended prematurely due to the COVID-19 pandemic in Slovakia, the season was curtailed on 11 March.

Team changes
HC Slovan Bratislava returns to the league in this season since it was not able to continue in the KHL due to financial problems.  The club has won eight Slovak championships (most recently in 2012) and one Czechoslovak championship (1979), making it the second most successful ice hockey club in Slovak history after their biggest rival HC Košice. In the season 2019–20 no team will be relegated. The winner of the Slovak 1. Liga will play in the Slovak Extraliga in the season 2020–21, so the league will have 14 teams.

HK Dukla Michalovce are playing in the league for the first time after winning promotion from the Slovak 1. Liga in a best-of-seven playoff against MsHK Žilina, which was therefore relegated.

HK Orange 20, who had participated in the league as a project to prepare the Slovakia junior ice hockey team for the IIHF World U20 Championship, were removed from the league.

Regular season
Each team played 48 games, playing each of the other twelve teams four times. Points were awarded for each game, where three points were awarded for winning in regulation time, two points for winning in overtime or shootouts, one point for losing in overtime or shootouts and zero points for losing in regulation time.

Standings

Group 1–6
Each team played 10 games, playing each of the other five teams two times. Points were awarded for each game, where three points were awarded for winning in regulation time, two points for winning in overtime or shootouts, one point for losing in overtime or shootouts and zero points for losing in regulation time.

Group 7–12
Each team played 10 games, playing each of the other five teams two times. Points were awarded for each game, where three points were awarded for winning in regulation time, two points for winning in overtime or shootouts, one point for losing in overtime or shootouts and zero points for losing in regulation time.

Playoffs
The playoffs were cancelled as a result of the COVID-19 pandemic in Slovakia.

Statistics

Scoring leaders

The following shows the top ten players who led the league in points, at the conclusion of the regular season.

Leading goaltenders
The following shows the top ten goaltenders who led the league in goals against average, provided that they have played at least 40% of their team's minutes, at the conclusion of the regular season.

References

External links
Official website

Slovak Extraliga seasons
Slovak
2019–20 in Slovak ice hockey leagues
Slovak Extraliga season